The culture of Auckland encompasses the city's artistic, culinary, literary, musical, political and social elements, and is well-known throughout the world. As New Zealand's largest city and one of the most important in the Southern Hemisphere, Auckland has a rich and dynamic cultural life and a lengthy, multicultural history. Auckland's genesis as New Zealand's cultural heart began with the large-scale settlement of its fertile land by Ngāti Whātua and various Tainui hapū, before greater settlement by further iwi such as Ngāpuhi and the arrival of Pākehā. Auckland's culture derives further from its multicultural demographics, thanks to large-scale Indian, Colombian, Venezuelan, Arab, Cook Islands Māori, Tongan, Tokelauan, British, Irish, Fijian, Chinese, Niuean, Samoan, Filipino, Khmer, and intertribal Māori immigration, among others. From there, these communities established ethnic strongholds (e.g. historically Samoans in Grey Lynn and Ponsonby, Chinese in Howick, Indians in Papatoetoe, etc).

Auckland has a strong arts scene, with dozens of galleries, and also a well-established food culture. The city is regarded as a highly cosmopolitan and ethnically superdiverse city, with the largest Polynesian population in the world.

References

Auckland
New Zealand culture